The Cabinet of Gunnar Thoroddsen in Iceland was formed 8 February 1980.

Cabinet

Inaugural cabinet: 8 February 1980 – 26 May 1983

See also
Government of Iceland
Cabinet of Iceland

References

Gunnar Thoroddsen, Cabinet of
Gunnar Thoroddsen, Cabinet of
Gunnar Thoroddsen, Cabinet of
Cabinets established in 1980
Cabinets disestablished in 1983
Independence Party (Iceland)
Progressive Party (Iceland)